The 2015–16 season was Millwall's 131st year in existence and their first back in League One since the 2009–10 season, after being relegated from The Championship the previous season. It was Millwall's 90th consecutive season in The Football League and 42nd in the third tier. Along with competing in League One, the club participated in the FA Cup, League Cup and Football League Trophy. The season marked the first full season in charge for club record goalscorer Neil Harris, who became manager in April. He led the club to fourth place, finishing with 81 points and a play-off place. This season covers the period from 1 July 2015 to 30 June 2016.

Squad

Statistics

|-
|colspan=14|Players out on loan:

|-
|colspan=14|Players who left the club during the season:

|}

Play-off Statistics

|}

Goals record

Disciplinary Record

Transfers

Transfers in

Transfers out

Loans in

Loans out

Competitions

Pre-season friendlies
On 5 May 2015, Millwall announced a pre-season friendly with AFC Wimbledon to take place on 18 July 2015. On 29 May 2015, Millwall added Stevenage to their pre-season schedule. On 1 June 2015, the club announced a friendly against Bromley. On 10 June 2015, Millwall announced they will host Portuguese side Tondela on 1 August 2015.

League One

League table

Result by matchday

Matches

Play Off

FA Cup

League Cup
On 16 June 2015, the first round draw was made, Millwall were drawn at home against Barnet.

Football League Trophy

On 8 August 2015, live on Soccer AM the draw for the first round of the Football League Trophy was drawn by Toni Duggan and Alex Scott. Lions will host Peterborough United. On 5 September 2015, the second round draw was shown live on Soccer AM and drawn by Charlie Austin and Ed Skrein. Millwall are to host Northampton Town.

References

Millwall
Millwall F.C. seasons